The ATLAS network is an association of the police tactical units of the 27 Member States of the European Union established following the terrorist attacks of 11 September 2001 upon the initiative of the Police Chiefs Task Force. ATLAS was initially informally established for information exchange and training activities co-operation between units and was later formalised by a Council decision in 2008 that also expanded ATLAS functions to include provision of assistance upon request to another Member State.

ATLAS uses the terms special intervention unit and crisis situation defined as:- 
 'Special intervention unit' is any law enforcement unit of a Member State which is specialised in the control of a crisis situation;
 'Crisis situation' is any situation in which the competent authorities of a Member State have reasonable grounds to believe that there is a criminal offence presenting a serious direct physical threat to persons, property, infrastructure or institutions in that Member State in particular  situations combating terrorism.

ATLAS recognises that a Member State may not have the means, resources or expertise to deal effectively with all crisis situations, in particular large crisis situations, and provides a framework for a Member State to request assistance from another member State.

In 2018, an ATLAS Support Office was established in EUROPOL's European Counter Terrorism Centre (ECTC), therefore strengthening the role of the ATLAS Network within the European police organisations.

Members
ATLAS consists of 39 special intervention units including units from non-EU Member States Switzerland, Norway, Iceland and the United Kingdom. The non-EU Member States can participate, including the use of all facilities, but have no voting rights.

See also 
List of police tactical units
Europol
Club de Berne, the equivalent for intelligence services

References

Further reading

External Links
 Foreign Affairs magazine: Together to Protect: Europol’s ATLAS Network and the Future of European Security 
 Austrian Ministry of the Interior: ATLAS-Verbund: Vernetzung gegen Terror 

 
Law enforcement in Europe
European Union